(literally: "The Shepherd Boys"), also known as the , is a Belgian choir of boys and men based in Waterloo, Belgium. It was established in 1974 and is currently conducted by Philippe Favette. Their repertoire includes works of sacred music as well as songs of the world.

History

Concerts and events 

Since Christmas 1974, Les Pastoureaux traditionally perform a series of concerts during the Christmas and holiday season, in Brussels (at the Centre for Fine Arts as well as in the St. Michael and St. Gudula Cathedral) and in Wallonia. They also sing at various music festivals, such as the Festival of Wallonia and the Festival of Flanders. Their numerous concerts include collaborations with artists such as the famous bass-baritone José van Dam, the Belgian soprano Marie-Noëlle de Callataÿ and the American soprano Jeanette Thompson.
Les Pastoureaux are regularly guests of private events, including most notably performances at the Royal Palace of Brussels and the Royal Castle of Laeken as well as their collaboration to the official show for the changeover to the euro (The Euro Bridge, Brussels, 31 December 2001). Besides, they are often called on for weddings ceremonies.
On several occasions, soloists of Les Pastoureaux have taken part in opera productions, at the National Opera of Belgium La Monnaie and abroad.

They represented Belgium at the Eurovision Choir of the Year 2017 in Riga, Latvia.

Directors of Music 
1974–2006: Bernard Pagnier
2006–: Philippe Favette

Summer tours 
Since 1980, Les Pastoureaux travel on a two-three week international concert tour during summer. They went to Argentina, Austria, Brazil, Canada, Colombia, Czech Republic, France, Germany, Hungary, Italy, Japan, Luxembourg, Poland, Portugal, Slovenia, Spain, Sweden, Switzerland and United States.

Discography 

 Les Pastoureaux. Petits Chanteurs de Waterloo (LP, 1979)
 Mozart, Buxtehude, Haendel, Haydn (LP, 1981)
 Les Pastoureaux. Petits Chanteurs de Waterloo (LP, 1983)
 Noël c'est l'Amour (LP, 1984)
 Schubert, Mozart, Buxtehude (LP, 1987)
 Haydn: Nelson Mass, Schubert: Mass in G Major D 167 (Soleil Levant)
 Mozart: Requiem (Soleil Levant 1991)
 Chants de Noël (Soleil Levant 1992)
 Mozart: Coronation Mass KV 317, Solemn Vespers of the Confessor KV 339 (Soleil Levant 1994)
 Christmas in Waterloo (Syrinx Record 1994)
 Les Pastoureaux en tournée (Soleil Levant 1999)
 Les Pastoureaux. Petits Chanteurs de Waterloo (for the choir's 30th birthday, Soleil Levant 2005)
 Llibre Vermell de Montserrat (with the early-music instrumental ensemble Millenarium, Psallentes and the Chœur de chambre de Namur, Ricercar 2007)
 For the Beauty of the Earth (2012)
 Around the World (2014)
 Fauré: Requiem (2017)
 Noël! (2019)
 Vivaldi: Gloria RV 589, Dixit Dominus RV 595 (with the Millenium Orchestra, 2022)

See also 
 Boys' choir

References

Notes

Further reading

External links 
  – multilingual
 Les Pastoureaux on YouTube
 Les Pastoureaux on Spotify
 
 
 Les Pastoureaux page at The Boy Choir & Soloists Directory (BCSD)

Choirs of children
Boys' and men's choirs
Belgian music
Musical groups established in 1974
Les Pastoureaux